Boris Zivkovic (born 2 May 1992) is an Austrian handball player for Alpla HC Hard and the Austrian national team.

He represented Austria at the 2019 World Men's Handball Championship.

References

External links

1992 births
Living people
Austrian male handball players
People from Bregenz
Sportspeople from Vorarlberg